Nephele is an Old World genus of moths in the family Sphingidae.

Species
Nephele accentifera (Palisot de Beauvois, 1821)
Nephele aequivalens (Walker, 1856)
Nephele argentifera (Walker, 1856)
Nephele bipartita Butler, 1878
Nephele comma Hopffer, 1857
Nephele comoroana Clark, 1923
Nephele densoi (Keferstein, 1870)
Nephele discifera Karsch, 1891
Nephele funebris (Fabricius, 1793)
Nephele hespera (Fabricius, 1775)
Nephele joiceyi Clark, 1923
Nephele lannini Jordan, 1926
Nephele leighi Joicey & Talbot, 1921
Nephele maculosa Rothschild & Jordan, 1903
Nephele monostigma Clark, 1925
Nephele oenopion (Hübner, 1824)
Nephele peneus (Cramer, 1776)
Nephele rectangulata Rothschild, 1895
Nephele rosae Butler, 1875
Nephele subvaria (Walker, 1856)
Nephele vau (Walker, 1856)
Nephele xylina Rothschild & Jordan, 1910

 
Macroglossini
Moth genera
Taxa named by Jacob Hübner